The Canadian Screen Award for Best Supporting Performance in a Film is an annual award, presented by the Academy of Canadian Cinema and Television as part of the Canadian Screen Awards program, to honour the best supporting performance in a theatrical film.

It is a merger of the former awards for Best Supporting Actor and Best Supporting Actress, following the academy's announcement in August 2022 that it would start presenting gender-neutral acting awards instead of gendered ones.

2020s

References

Film awards for supporting actor
Film awards for supporting actress
Supporting Performance
Awards established in 2023